Benevolent prejudice is a superficially positive prejudice that is expressed in terms of positive beliefs and emotional responses, which are associated with hostile prejudices or result in keeping affected groups in inferior positions in society. Benevolent prejudice can be expressed towards those of different race, religion, ideology, country, sex, sexual orientation, or gender identity.

Some of the earliest and most notable studies on benevolent prejudice were conducted by the researchers Susan Fiske and Peter Glick, with the primary focus of their research being the issue of sexism. Benevolent prejudice derives from their studies on ambivalent sexism, claiming that there are two main types of sexist attitudes: hostile and benevolent sexism.

The term benevolent sexism eventually broadened into benevolent prejudice, with one of the earliest uses of the term being in a study by Susan Fiske and Peter Glick that focused on benevolent and hostile sexism across cultures.

Application 
Benevolent prejudice is a superficially positive type of prejudice that is expressed in terms of apparently positive beliefs and emotional responses. Though this type of prejudice associates supposedly good things with certain groups, it still has the result of keeping the group members in inferior positions in society.  Benevolent prejudices can help justify any hostile prejudices a person has toward a particular group. It is defined by UK LGBT rights charity Stonewall as "expressions of positive views about minority groups that are not intended to demonstrate less positive attitudes towards them, but which may still produce negative consequences".

Evidence also shows that there is a correlation between benevolent prejudices and hostile prejudices towards a particular group, in particular regarding the issue of benevolent prejudice towards women and misogyny.

Examples

Race 
In an experiment run by Judd, Park, Ryan, Brauer, and Kraus (1995), perceptions of African Americans held by European Americans show that they held hostile beliefs indicating that they viewed African Americans as hostile, cliquish, irresponsible, and loud. However, the same European American participants held benevolent beliefs that African Americans were athletic, musical, religious, and had strong family ties. The study was also done with African American participants who were asked to share their beliefs about European Americans. The African Americans said that European Americans were self-centered, greedy, stuffy/uptight, and sheltered from the real world.  However, the same African Americans held benevolent beliefs that European Americans were intelligent, organized, independent, and financially well-off.

LGBT and disabled people
A Stonewall UK publication (Understanding Prejudice: Attitudes towards minorities) published in 2004 has found that interviewees used benevolent stereotyping of gay men as "fun" and "caring stereotypes" of disabled individuals, saying they were "vulnerable and in need of protection". This was seen as contrasting to the negative prejudices of Travellers and asylum seekers who were often the subject of aggressive prejudice. The survey also stated that:
These stereotypes are not intended to demonstrate a less positive attitude towards these groups, but lesbians, gay men or disabled people can experience these views as negative and discriminatory. This benevolent prejudice demonstrates a lack of understanding of what being disabled or lesbian and gay can mean; a lack of awareness of the more serious discrimination that these groups often experience; and the changing expectations and rights of these minority groups. Other research has suggested that these benevolent attitudes can play an important role in the social exclusion of particular groups, for example because labels like "nice", "kind" and "helpless" can define some minority groups as not competent or suitable for powerful positions.

The survey also showed that men were more likely to exhibit aggressive prejudice, whereas women were more likely to exhibit benevolent prejudice.

Sexism across cultures 
An experiment run by Glick and Fiske et al. aimed to measure benevolent and hostile sexism across various countries and cultures. The study found that in countries where the levels of hostile sexism were high, the levels of benevolent sexism were also high. Researchers claimed that "the strength of these correlations supports the idea that HS and BS act as complementary forms of sexism." This was exemplified in countries such as Cuba and Nigeria, where men scored higher on sexism, resulting in a higher hostile and benevolent sexism score amongst women; therefore, the results in those countries provided "evidence consistent with the notion that disadvantaged groups adopt the system-justifying beliefs of dominant groups."

Media literacy and stereotyping 
An experiment run by Srividya Ramasubramanian and Mary Beth Oliver aimed to measure the reduction in prejudice in their participants.  In the experiment, participants were to watch a media literacy video, then proceed to read stereotypical and counter-stereotypical news stories about African Americans, Asian-Indians, and Caucasian-Americans. The participants were then prompted to fill out a questionnaire regarding their feelings about the aforementioned groups. The results revealed that the participants were more likely to display benevolent prejudice towards the Asian-Indian group, than to the Caucasian-American or African American group. Benevolent prejudice towards Asian-Indians was seen as a result of the cultural stereotypes associated with the group, such as passivity and deprivation, thus the results were "consistent with the argument that benevolent feelings stem from notions of superiority of dominant groups over subordinate groups seen as incompetent, yet sociable."

See also
 Ambivalent prejudice
 Ambivalent sexism
 Racism
 Prejudice
 Stereotype
 Counterstereotype
 Positive stereotype
 "Women are wonderful" effect

References

Further reading 
 

Prejudices